Carl Gustaf Bernhard (28 April 1910, Jakob parish, Stockholm Municipality – 13 January 2001, Lidingö parish) was a Swedish physician, neurophysiologist and academic. He was married to Gurli Lemon-Bernhard, operasinger and soprano. Together they had four children: Carl Johan, Pontus, Per and Blenda.

Early life
He contracted tuberculosis as a youth. After years of treatment, he recovered.  This experience led him to want to become a doctor. 

He was awarded a Ph.D. in 1940 as a result of his dissertation on vision neurophysiology.

Career
He was a professor at the Karolinska Institute from 1948 through 1971.

In 1968, he was made a member of the Royal Swedish Academy of Sciences.  He was appointed Permanent Secretary of the Academy during the years 1973 through 1981.  In this period, he developed a special interest in one of his predecessors -- Jons Jacob Berzelius. He was elected a Foreign Honorary Member of the American Academy of Arts and Sciences in 1976.

Bernhard founded the Berzelius Society and published two books on Berzelius:
 1985 – Med Berzelius bland franska snillen och slocknade vulkaner
 1993 – Berzelius Europaresenären - bland forskare, prostar och poeter

Notes

References
 This article was translated from the Swedish Wikipedia

1910 births
2001 deaths
Swedish neuroscientists
Academic staff of the Karolinska Institute
Members of the Royal Swedish Academy of Sciences
Fellows of the American Academy of Arts and Sciences
Neurophysiologists